The U.S. Senate Committee on Small Business and Entrepreneurship is a standing committee of the United States Senate. It has jurisdiction over the Small Business Administration and is also charged with researching and investigating all problems of American small business enterprises.

History
On October 8, 1940, the Senate established the Special Committee to Study and Survey Problems of Small Business Enterprises (also known as the Special Committee to Study Problems of American Small Business). On January 31, 1949, this special committee was terminated, but on February 20, 1950, the Select Committee on Small Business was created with approval of Senate Resolution 58 during the 81st Congress. That first committee had just nine members. It was the first select committee created by the Senate that still operates today.

The select committee was terminated on March 25, 1981, when it became the Committee on Small Business, a standing committee. On June 29, 2001, Sen. John F. Kerry (D-Mass.) changed the name of the committee to the Committee on Small Business and Entrepreneurship.

The committee's jurisdiction has been changed several times since it was first created, through additional powers or by changing the manner in which committee members are appointed. While first established as a select committee with limited responsibilities, it now possesses virtually all the characteristics of a standing committee, as outlined under Senate Rule 25.

During the 96th Congress, the committee acted on legislation to reauthorize the Small Business Administration that expanded the agency to include loan programs for employee ownership, Small Business Development Centers, and increased export development assistance for small businesses.

Since its creation, the committee has held hearings on paperwork reduction and elimination (which eventually led to the Paperwork Reduction Act), capital formation, tax and securities law reform for small business, steel plant shutdowns, and the impact of inflation on governmental actions on the housing industry.

The committee was changed from small business to Committee on Small Business and Entrepreneurship beginning in 1981.

Jurisdiction
Initially, the Small Business Committee only had limited oversight over the Small Business Administration. The committee was directed to report to the Senate from time to time with its recommendations regarding small business matters.

With the adoption of S. Res. 272 during the 82nd Congress, the committee was granted subpoena power, and the ability to "sit and act at such times during the sessions, recesses, and adjourned periods of the Senate." These abilities are common to the other standing committees in the Senate. S. Res. 272 also provided for a more structured committee, with specific requirements on a quorum of members needed for the committee to conduct its business, and its own committee staff.

S. Res. 58 stipulated that beginning with the 95th Congress, the Small Business Committee would be granted jurisdiction over all legislation relating to the Small Business Administration. This ability was granted S. Res. 104, agreed to on April 29, 1976, provided for this new jurisdiction, granting not only authority over small business legislation but additional oversight over the agency as well. The committee has also been granted the right of re-referral of legislation from other standing committees, where appropriate.

Today, the jurisdiction of the committee is roughly the same as it was when it was first established, chiefly the Small Business Administration and the Small Investment Act. However, by tradition, the committee reviews all matters that apply to small business that are not by themselves subject to the jurisdiction over another standing committee. The committee continues to study and survey by means of research and investigation all problems of American small business enterprises, with the intent to provide advice to Congress in enacting appropriate legislation. The committee also is responsible for reviewing nominations for positions within the Small Business Administration, including its Administrator, Chief Council for Advocacy, and Inspector General.

Members, 118th Congress

Chairs

Select Committee on Small Business

Committee on Small Business & Entrepreneurship

Historical committee rosters

117th Congress

116th Congress

115th Congress

Source

See also
 List of current United States Senate committees
 U.S. House Committee on Small Business

External links
Senate Committee on Small Business and Entrepreneurship, official website (Archive)
Senate Small Business and Entrepreneurship Committee. Legislation activity and reports, Congress.gov.

References
Riddick, Floyd M., and Alan S. Frumin. "Committee on Small Business" in Riddick's Senate Procedure, 378–81. United States Senate, 101st Congress, 2nd Session, Washington, D.C.: Government Printing Office, 1992.

Small Business
Economy of the United States
1950 establishments in Washington, D.C.